The Journal of Molecular Recognition is a monthly peer-reviewed scientific journal publishing original research papers and reviews describing molecular recognition phenomena in biology. The current editor-in-chief is Marc H. V. van Regenmortel (École supérieure de biotechnologie Strasbourg). It was established in 1988 and is published by John Wiley & Sons.

Abstracting and indexing 
Journal of Molecular Recognition is abstracted and indexed in:

According to the Journal Citation Reports, the journal has a 2020 impact factor of 2.137, ranking it 53rd out of 72 journals in the category "Biophysics" and 247th out of 297 journals in the category "Biochemistry & Molecular Biology".

Highest cited papers 
According to the Web of Science, the most-cited articles of this journal are:
 "'Automated docking of flexible ligands: Applications of AutoDock", Volume 9, Issue 1, Jan-Feb 1996, Pages: 1-5, Goodsell DS, Morris GM, Olson AJ.
 "Improving biosensor analysis", Volume 12, Issue 5, Sep-Oct 1999, Pages: 279-284, Myszka DG.
 "Reversible and irreversible immobilization of enzymes on Graphite Fibrils(TM)", Volume 9, Issue 5-6, Sep-Dec 1996, Pages: 383-388, Dong LW, Fischer AB, Lu M, et al.
 "Isothermal titration calorimetry and differential scanning calorimetry as complementary tools to investigate the energetics of biomolecular recognition", Volume 12, Issue 1, Jan-Feb 1999, Pages: 3–18, Jelesarov I, Bosshard HR.

References

External links 
 

Biochemistry journals
Wiley (publisher) academic journals
Publications established in 1988
English-language journals
Monthly journals